The 1938–39 Yugoslav Ice Hockey League season was the third season of the Yugoslav Ice Hockey League, the top level of ice hockey in Yugoslavia. Four teams participated in the league, and Ilirija have won the championship.

Teams
Ilirija
ZKD Zagreb
Marathon Zagreb
HAŠK Zagreb

Tournament

Semifinals
5.1.1939 ZKD Zagreb – Marathon Zagreb 2–0 (0–0, 2–0, 0–0)
5.1.1939 Ilirja – HAŠK Zagreb 6–0 (Hašk Zagreb forfeited due to late arrival to the tournament, Ilirja was awarded 6–0 victory.)

3rd place
6.1.1939 HAŠK Zagreb – Marathon Zagreb 5–3 (1–0, 3–2, 1–1)

Final
6.1.1939 Ilirija – ZKD Zagreb 11–0 (6–0, 2–0, 3–0)

Final ranking
Ilirija
ZKD Zagreb
HAŠK Zagreb
Marathon Zagreb

Champions
Ice Rihar, Tone Pogačnik. Luce Žitnik, Jule Kačič, Karel Pavletič, Oto Gregorič, Viljem Morbacher, Milan Lombar, Jože Gogala.

References

External links
Yugoslav Ice Hockey League seasons

Yugo
Yugoslav Ice Hockey League seasons
1938–39 in Yugoslav ice hockey